Instrumentum regni (literally, "instrument of monarchy", therefore "of government") is a Latin phrase perhaps inspired by Tacitus, used to express the exploitation of religion by State or ecclesiastical polity as a means of controlling the masses, or in particular to achieve political and mundane ends.

History 
The concept expressed by the phrase has undergone various forms and has been taken up by several writers and philosophers throughout history. Among these Polybius, Lucretius, Machiavelli, Montesquieu, Vittorio Alfieri and Giacomo Leopardi.

Among the oldest and most important there was undoubtedly the Greek historian Polybius, who in his Histories says:

Before Polybius, a similar thesis was expressed in the fifth century BC. from the Athenian politician and writer Critias, disciple of Socrates, in a satirical drama called Sisyphus, of which a long fragment has been handed down to us.

In the Renaissance the concept was taken up by Niccolò Machiavelli in his The Prince.

See also

Opium of the people, a similar expression which associated the numbing and controlling effects of opium with religion

References

Latin words and phrases
Political terminology
Religion and politics
Superstitions